

Peerage of England

|Duke of Cornwall (1337)||none||1537||1603||
|-
|Marquess of Winchester (1551)||William Paulet, 3rd Marquess of Winchester||1576||1598||
|-
|rowspan="2"|Earl of Arundel (1138)||Henry FitzAlan, 19th Earl of Arundel||1544||1580||Died
|-
|Philip Howard, 20th Earl of Arundel||1580||1589||Attainted, and his honours were forfeited
|-
|Earl of Oxford (1142)||Edward de Vere, 17th Earl of Oxford||1562||1604||
|-
|Earl of Shrewsbury (1442)||George Talbot, 6th Earl of Shrewsbury||1560||1590||
|-
|Earl of Kent (1465)||Henry Grey, 6th Earl of Kent||1573||1615||
|-
|Earl of Derby (1485)||Henry Stanley, 4th Earl of Derby||1572||1593||
|-
|rowspan="2"|Earl of Worcester (1514)||William Somerset, 3rd Earl of Worcester||1549||1589||Died
|-
|Edward Somerset, 4th Earl of Worcester||1589||1628||
|-
|Earl of Cumberland (1525)||George Clifford, 3rd Earl of Cumberland||1570||1605||
|-
|rowspan="3"|Earl of Rutland (1525)||Edward Manners, 3rd Earl of Rutland||1563||1587||Died; Barony of Ros succeeded by his daughter, see below
|-
|John Manners, 4th Earl of Rutland||1587||1588||Died
|-
|Roger Manners, 5th Earl of Rutland||1588||1612||
|-
|Earl of Huntingdon (1529)||Henry Hastings, 3rd Earl of Huntingdon||1561||1595||
|-
|rowspan="2"|Earl of Sussex (1529)||Thomas Radclyffe, 3rd Earl of Sussex||1557||1583||Died
|-
|Henry Radclyffe, 4th Earl of Sussex||1583||1593||
|-
|Earl of Bath (1536)||William Bourchier, 3rd Earl of Bath||1561||1623||
|-
|rowspan="2"|Earl of Southampton (1547)||Henry Wriothesley, 2nd Earl of Southampton||1550||1581||Died
|-
|Henry Wriothesley, 3rd Earl of Southampton||1581||1624||
|-
|rowspan="2"|Earl of Bedford (1550)||Francis Russell, 2nd Earl of Bedford||1555||1585||Died
|-
|Edward Russell, 3rd Earl of Bedford||1585||1627||
|-
|Earl of Pembroke (1551)||Henry Herbert, 2nd Earl of Pembroke||1570||1601||
|-
|Earl of Devon (1553)||William Courtenay, de jure 3rd Earl of Devon||1557||1630||
|-
|rowspan="2"|Earl of Northumberland (1557)||Henry Percy, 8th Earl of Northumberland||1572||1585||Died
|-
|Henry Percy, 9th Earl of Northumberland||1585||1632||
|-
|Earl of Hertford (1559)||Edward Seymour, 1st Earl of Hertford||1559||1621||
|-
|Earl of Warwick (1561)||Ambrose Dudley, 1st Earl of Warwick||1561||1590||
|-
|Earl of Leicester (1564)||Robert Dudley, 1st Earl of Leicester||1564||1588||Died, title extinct
|-
|Earl of Essex (1572)||Robert Devereux, 2nd Earl of Essex||1576||1601||
|-
|rowspan="2"|Earl of Lincoln (1572)||Edward Clinton, 1st Earl of Lincoln||1572||1585||Died
|-
|Henry Clinton, 2nd Earl of Lincoln||1585||1616||
|-
|Viscount Montagu (1554)||Anthony Browne, 1st Viscount Montagu||1554||1592||
|-
|rowspan="2"|Viscount Howard of Bindon (1559)||Thomas Howard, 1st Viscount Howard of Bindon||1559||1582||Died
|-
|Henry Howard, 2nd Viscount Howard of Bindon||1582||1590||
|-
|Baron de Ros (1264)||Elizabeth Cecil, 16th Baroness de Ros||1587||1591||Barony previously held by the Earls of Rutland
|-
|Baron Grey de Wilton (1295)||Arthur Grey, 14th Baron Grey de Wilton||1562||1593||
|-
|Baron Morley (1299)||Edward Parker, 12th Baron Morley||1577||1618||
|- 
|Baron Zouche of Haryngworth (1308)||Edward la Zouche, 11th Baron Zouche||1569||1625||
|- 
|Baron Audley of Heleigh (1313)||George Tuchet, 11th Baron Audley||1563||1617||
|- 
|Baron Cobham of Kent (1313)||William Brooke, 10th Baron Cobham||1558||1597||
|- 
|rowspan="2"|Baron Willoughby de Eresby (1313)||Catherine Willoughby, 12th Baroness Willoughby de Eresby||1526||1580||Died
|- 
|Peregrine Bertie, 13th Baron Willoughby de Eresby||1580||1601||
|- 
|Baron Dacre (1321)||Gregory Fiennes, 10th Baron Dacre||1558||1594||
|- 
|Baron Scrope of Bolton (1371)||Henry Scrope, 9th Baron Scrope of Bolton||1549||1591||
|- 
|rowspan="2"|Baron Bergavenny (1392)||Henry Nevill, 6th Baron Bergavenny||1536||1585||Died
|- 
|Mary Fane, 3rd Baroness Bergavenny||1585||1626||
|- 
|Baron Berkeley (1421)||Henry Berkeley, 7th Baron Berkeley||1534||1613||
|- 
|rowspan="2"|Baron Dudley (1440)||Edward Sutton, 4th Baron Dudley||1553||1586||Died
|- 
|Edward Sutton, 5th Baron Dudley||1586||1643||
|- 
|Baron Saye and Sele (1447)||Richard Fiennes, 7th Baron Saye and Sele||1573||1613||
|- 
|rowspan="2"|Baron Stourton (1448)||John Stourton, 9th Baron Stourton||1557||1588||Died
|- 
|Edward Stourton, 10th Baron Stourton||1588||1633||
|- 
|Baron Ogle (1461)||Cuthbert Ogle, 7th Baron Ogle||1562||1597||
|- 
|rowspan="2"|Baron Mountjoy (1465)||James Blount, 6th Baron Mountjoy||1544||1582||Died
|- 
|William Blount, 7th Baron Mountjoy||1582||1594||
|- 
|Baron Willoughby de Broke (1491)||Fulke Greville, 4th Baron Willoughby de Broke||1562||1606||
|- 
|rowspan="2"|Baron Monteagle (1514)||William Stanley, 3rd Baron Monteagle||1560||1581||Died
|-
|William Parker, 4th Baron Monteagle||1581||1622||
|-
|Baron Vaux of Harrowden (1523)||William Vaux, 3rd Baron Vaux of Harrowden||1556||1595||
|-
|Baron Sandys of the Vine (1529)||William Sandys, 3rd Baron Sandys||1560||1623||
|-
|rowspan="2"|Baron Burgh (1529)||William Burgh, 2nd Baron Burgh||1550||1584||Died
|-
|Thomas Burgh, 3rd Baron Burgh||1584||1597||
|-
|rowspan="2"|Baron Windsor (1529)||Frederick Windsor, 4th Baron Windsor||1574||1585||Died
|-
|Henry Windsor, 5th Baron Windsor||1585||1605||
|-
|rowspan="2"|Baron Wentworth (1529)||Thomas Wentworth, 2nd Baron Wentworth||1551||1584||Died
|-
|Henry Wentworth, 3rd Baron Wentworth||1584||1593||
|-
|Baron Mordaunt (1532)||Lewis Mordaunt, 3rd Baron Mordaunt||1571||1601||
|-
|Baron Cromwell (1540)||Henry Cromwell, 2nd Baron Cromwell||1551||1593||
|-
|Baron Eure (1544)||William Eure, 2nd Baron Eure||1548||1594||
|-
|Baron Wharton (1545)||Philip Wharton, 3rd Baron Wharton||1572||1625||
|-
|Baron Sheffield (1547)||Edmund Sheffield, 3rd Baron Sheffield||1568||1646||
|-
|rowspan="2"|Baron Rich (1547)||Robert Rich, 2nd Baron Rich||1567||1581||Died
|-
|Robert Rich, 3rd Baron Rich||1581||1618||
|-
|Baron Willoughby of Parham (1547)||Charles Willoughby, 2nd Baron Willoughby of Parham||1570||1612||
|-
|Baron Lumley (1547)||John Lumley, 1st Baron Lumley||1547||1609||
|-
|Baron Darcy of Aston (1548)||John Darcy, 2nd Baron Darcy of Aston||1558||1602||
|-
|rowspan="2"|Baron Darcy of Chiche (1551)||John Darcy, 2nd Baron Darcy of Chiche||1558||1581||Died
|-
|Thomas Darcy, 3rd Baron Darcy of Chiche||1581||1640||
|-
|Baron Paget (1552)||Thomas Paget, 3rd Baron Paget||1563||1589||Attainted, and title was forfeited
|-
|Baron North (1554)||Roger North, 2nd Baron North||1564||1600||
|-
|Baron Howard of Effingham (1554)||Charles Howard, 2nd Baron Howard of Effingham||1573||1624||
|-
|Baron Chandos (1554)||Giles Brydges, 3rd Baron Chandos||1573||1594||
|-
|Baron Hunsdon (1559)||Henry Carey, 1st Baron Hunsdon||1559||1596||
|-
|rowspan="2"|Baron St John of Bletso (1559)||Oliver St John, 1st Baron St John of Bletso||1559||1582||Died
|-
|John St John, 2nd Baron St John of Bletso||1582||1596||
|-
|Baron Buckhurst (1567)||Thomas Sackville, 1st Baron Buckhurst||1567||1608||
|-
|Baron De La Warr (1570)||William West, 1st Baron De La Warr||1570||1595||
|-
|Baron Burghley (1571)||William Cecil, 1st Baron Burghley||1571||1598||
|-
|Baron Cheyne of Toddington (1572)||Henry Cheyne, 1st Baron Cheyne||1572||1587||Died, title extinct
|-
|rowspan="2"|Baron Compton (1572)||Henry Compton, 1st Baron Compton||1572||1589||Died
|-
|William Compton, 2nd Baron Compton||1589||1630||
|-
|Baron Norreys (1572)||Henry Norris, 1st Baron Norreys||1572||1601||
|-
|}

Peerage of Scotland

|Duke of Rothesay (1398)||none||1567||1594||
|-
|rowspan=2|Duke of Lennox (1581)||Esmé Stewart, 1st Duke of Lennox||1581||1583||New creation, died
|-
|Ludovic Stewart, 2nd Duke of Lennox||1583||1624||
|-
|Earl of Mar (1114)||John Erskine, 19th/2nd Earl of Mar||1572||1634||
|-
|Earl of Sutherland (1235)||Alexander Gordon, 12th Earl of Sutherland||1567||1594||
|-
|rowspan=2|Earl of Angus (1389)||Archibald Douglas, 8th Earl of Angus||1558||1588||Died
|-
|William Douglas, 9th Earl of Angus||1588||1591||
|-
|Earl of Crawford (1398)||David Lindsay, 11th Earl of Crawford||1574||1607||
|-
|Earl of Menteith (1427)||John Graham, 6th Earl of Menteith||1578||1598||
|-
|Earl of Huntly (1445)||George Gordon, 6th Earl of Huntly||1579||1636||
|-
|rowspan=2|Earl of Erroll (1452)||Andrew Hay, 8th Earl of Erroll||1573||1585||Died
|-
|Francis Hay, 9th Earl of Erroll||1585||1631||
|-
|rowspan=2|Earl of Caithness (1455)||George Sinclair, 4th Earl of Caithness||1529||1582||Died
|-
|George Sinclair, 5th Earl of Caithness||1582||1643||
|-
|rowspan=2|Earl of Argyll (1457)||Colin Campbell, 6th Earl of Argyll||1573||1584||Died
|-
|Archibald Campbell, 7th Earl of Argyll||1584||1638||
|-
|Earl of Atholl (1457)||John Stewart, 5th Earl of Atholl||1579||1595||
|-
|rowspan=3|Earl of Morton (1458)||James Douglas, 4th Earl of Morton||1550||1581||Attainted
|-
|Archibald Douglas, 5th Earl of Morton||1586||1588||Restored; died
|-
|William Douglas, 6th Earl of Morton||1588||1606||
|-
|Earl of Rothes (1458)||Andrew Leslie, 5th Earl of Rothes||1558||1611||
|-
|rowspan=2|Earl Marischal (1458)||William Keith, 4th Earl Marischal||1530||1581||Died
|-
|George Keith, 5th Earl Marischal||1581||1623||
|-
|rowspan=2|Earl of Buchan (1469)||Christina Stewart, 4th Countess of Buchan||1551||1580||Died
|-
|James Douglas, 5th Earl of Buchan||1580||1601||
|-
|Earl of Glencairn (1488)||James Cunningham, 7th Earl of Glencairn||1578||1630||
|-
|Earl of Arran (1503)||James Hamilton, 3rd Earl of Arran||1575||1609||Earldom held by James Stewart, 1581–1585, see below
|-
|Earl of Montrose (1503)||John Graham, 3rd Earl of Montrose||1571||1608||
|-
|rowspan=3|Earl of Eglinton (1507)||Hugh Montgomerie, 3rd Earl of Eglinton||1546||1585||Died
|-
|Hugh Montgomerie, 4th Earl of Eglinton||1585||1586||
|-
|Hugh Montgomerie, 5th Earl of Eglinton||1586||1612||
|-
|Earl of Cassilis (1509)||John Kennedy, 5th Earl of Cassilis||1576||1615||
|-
|Earl of Moray (1562)||Elizabeth Stuart, 2nd Countess of Moray||1570||1591||
|-
|Earl of Lennox (1578)||Robert Stewart, 1st Earl of Lennox||1578||1580||Resigned
|-
|Earl of March (1580)||Robert Stewart, 1st Earl of March||1580||1586||Died, title extinct
|-
|Earl of Bothwell (1581)||Francis Stewart, 1st Earl of Bothwell||1581||1592||New creation
|-
|rowspan=3|Earl of Gowrie (1581)||William Ruthven, 1st Earl of Gowrie||1581||1584||New creation, title forfeited
|-
|James Ruthven, 2nd Earl of Gowrie||1584||1588||
|-
|John Ruthven, 3rd Earl of Gowrie||1588||1600||
|-
|Earl of Arran (1581)||James Stewart, Earl of Arran||1581||1585||New creation; attainted
|-
|Earl of Orkney (1581)||Robert Stewart, 1st Earl of Orkney||1581||1593||New creation
|-
|Lord Somerville (1430)||Hugh Somerville, 7th Lord Somerville||1569||1597||
|-
|Lord Forbes (1442)||William Forbes, 7th Lord Forbes||1547||1593||
|-
|Lord Maxwell (1445)||John Maxwell, 8th Lord Maxwell||1555||1593||
|-
|Lord Glamis (1445)||Patrick Lyon, 9th Lord Glamis||1578||1615||
|-
|rowspan=2|Lord Lindsay of the Byres (1445)||Patrick Lindsay, 6th Lord Lindsay||1563||1589||Died
|-
|James Lindsay, 7th Lord Lindsay||1589||1601||
|-
|rowspan=2|Lord Saltoun (1445)||Alexander Abernethy, 6th Lord Saltoun||1543||1587||Died
|-
|George Abernethy, 7th Lord Saltoun||1587||1590||
|-
|rowspan=2|Lord Gray (1445)||Patrick Gray, 4th Lord Gray||1541||1584||Died
|-
|Patrick Gray, 5th Lord Gray||1584||1608||
|-
|Lord Sinclair (1449)||Henry Sinclair, 5th Lord Sinclair||1570||1601||
|-
|Lord Fleming (1451)||John Fleming, 6th Lord Fleming||1572||1619||
|-
|rowspan=2|Lord Seton (1451)||George Seton, 7th Lord Seton||1549||1586||Died
|-
|Robert Seton, 8th Lord Seton||1586||1603||
|-
|rowspan=2|Lord Borthwick (1452)||William Borthwick, 6th Lord Borthwick||1566||1582||Died
|-
|James Borthwick, 7th Lord Borthwick||1582||1599||
|-
|Lord Boyd (1454)||Robert Boyd, 5th Lord Boyd||1558||1590||
|-
|Lord Oliphant (1455)||Laurence Oliphant, 4th Lord Oliphant||1566||1593||
|-
|Lord Livingston (1458)||William Livingstone, 6th Lord Livingston||1553||1592||
|-
|Lord Cathcart (1460)||Alan Cathcart, 4th Lord Cathcart||1547||1618||
|-
|Lord Lovat (1464)||Simon Fraser, 6th Lord Lovat||1577||1633||
|-
|rowspan=2|Lord Innermeath (1470)||James Stewart, 5th Lord Innermeath||1569||1585||Died
|-
|John Stewart, 6th Lord Innermeath||1585||1603||
|-
|Lord Carlyle of Torthorwald (1473)||Elizabeth Douglas, 5th Lady Carlyle||1575||1605||
|-
|Lord Home (1473)||Alexander Home, 6th Lord Home||1575||1619||
|-
|Lord Ruthven (1488)||William Ruthven, 4th Lord Ruthven||1566||1584||Created Earl of Gowrie, see above
|-
|Lord Crichton of Sanquhar (1488)||Robert Crichton, 8th Lord Crichton of Sanquhar||1569||1612||
|-
|Lord Drummond of Cargill (1488)||Patrick Drummond, 3rd Lord Drummond||1571||1600||
|-
|rowspan=2|Lord Hay of Yester (1488)||William Hay, 5th Lord Hay of Yester||1557||1586||Died
|-
|William Hay, 6th Lord Hay of Yester||1586||1591||
|-
|Lord Sempill (1489)||Robert Sempill, 4th Lord Sempill||1576||1611||
|-
|Lord Herries of Terregles (1490)||Agnes Maxwell, 4th Lady Herries of Terregles||1543||1594||
|-
|Lord Ogilvy of Airlie (1491)||James Ogilvy, 5th Lord Ogilvy of Airlie||1549||1606||
|-
|rowspan=2|Lord Ross (1499)||James Ross, 4th Lord Ross||1556||1581||Died
|-
|Robert Ross, 5th Lord Ross||1581||1595||
|-
|Lord Elphinstone (1509)||Robert Elphinstone, 3rd Lord Elphinstone||1547||1602||
|-
|Lord Methven (1528)||Henry Stewart, 3rd Lord Methven||1572||1580||Died, title extinct
|-
|Lord Ochiltree (1543)||Andrew Stewart, 2nd Lord Ochiltree||1548||1591||
|-
|Lord Torphichen (1564)||James Sandilands, 2nd Lord Torphichen||1579||1617||
|-
|Lord Doune (1581)||James Stewart, 1st Lord Doune||1581||1590||New creation
|-
|Lord Dingwall (1584)||Andrew Keith, 1st Lord Dingwall||1584||abt. 1599||New creation
|-
|Lord Paisley (1587)||Claud Hamilton, 1st Lord Paisley||1587||1621||New creation
|-
|}

Peerage of Ireland

|rowspan=2|Earl of Kildare (1316)||Gerald FitzGerald, 11th Earl of Kildare||1569||1585||Died
|-
|Henry FitzGerald, 12th Earl of Kildare||1585||1597||
|-
|Earl of Ormond (1328)||Thomas Butler, 10th Earl of Ormond||1546||1614||
|-
|Earl of Desmond (1329)||Gerald FitzGerald, 15th Earl of Desmond||1558||1582||Attainted
|-
|Earl of Waterford (1446)||George Talbot, 6th Earl of Waterford||1560||1590||
|-
|Earl of Tyrone (1542)||Hugh O'Neill, 3rd Earl of Tyrone||1562||1608||
|-
|rowspan=2|Earl of Clanricarde (1543)||Richard Burke, 2nd Earl of Clanricarde||1544||1582||Died
|-
|Ulick Burke, 3rd Earl of Clanricarde||1582||1601||
|-
|rowspan=2|Earl of Thomond (1543)||Connor O'Brien, 3rd Earl of Thomond||1553||1581||Died
|-
|Donogh O'Brien, 4th Earl of Thomond||1581||1624||
|-
|Earl of Clancare (1565)||Donald McCarthy, 1st Earl of Clancare||1565||1597||
|-
|Viscount Gormanston (1478)||Christopher Preston, 4th Viscount Gormanston||1569||1599||
|-
|rowspan=2|Viscount Buttevant (1541)||James de Barry, 4th Viscount Buttevant||1557||1581||Died
|-
|David de Barry, 5th Viscount Buttevant||1581||1617||
|-
|Viscount Baltinglass (1541)||James Eustace, 3rd Viscount Baltinglass||1578||1585||Attainted, title forfeited
|-
|Viscount Mountgarret (1550)||Edmund Butler, 2nd Viscount Mountgarret||1571||1602||
|-
|rowspan=2|Baron Athenry (1172)||Richard II de Bermingham||1547||1580||Died
|-
|Edmond I de Bermingham||1580||1612||
|-
|Baron Kingsale (1223)||Gerald de Courcy, 17th Baron Kingsale||1535||1599||
|-
|Baron Kerry (1223)||Thomas Fitzmaurice, 16th Baron Kerry||1550||1590||
|-
|Baron Slane (1370)||Thomas Fleming, 10th Baron Slane||1578||1597||
|-
|rowspan=2|Baron Howth (1425)||Christopher St Lawrence, 8th Baron Howth||1558||1589||Died
|-
|Nicholas St Lawrence, 9th Baron Howth||1589||1606||
|-
|Baron Killeen (1449)||James Plunkett, 8th Baron Killeen||1567||1595||
|-
|Baron Trimlestown (1461)||Peter Barnewall, 6th Baron Trimlestown||1573||1598||
|-
|Baron Dunsany (1462)||Patrick Plunkett, 7th Baron of Dunsany||1564||1601||
|-
|Baron Delvin (1486)||Christopher Nugent, 6th Baron Delvin||1559||1602||
|-
|Baron Power (1535)||John Power, 3rd Baron Power||1545||1592||
|-
|Baron Dunboyne (1541)||James Butler, 2nd/12th Baron Dunboyne||1566||1624||
|-
|Baron Louth (1541)||Oliver Plunkett, 4th Baron Louth||1575||1607||
|-
|rowspan=2|Baron Upper Ossory (1541)||Barnaby Fitzpatrick, 2nd Baron Upper Ossory||1575||1581||Died
|-
|Florence Fitzpatrick, 3rd Baron Upper Ossory||1581||1613||
|-
|Baron Inchiquin (1543)||Murrough O'Brien, 4th Baron Inchiquin||1573||1597||
|-
|rowspan=2|Baron Ardenerie (1580)||John Bourke, 1st Baron Ardenerie||1580||1580||New creation; died
|-
|William Bourke, 2nd Baron Ardenerie||1580||1591||
|-
|rowspan=2|Baron Bourke of Castleconnell (1580)||William Bourke, 1st Baron Bourke of Connell||1580||1584||New creation; died
|-
|John Bourke, 2nd Baron Bourke of Connell||1584||1592||
|-
|Baron Cahir (1583)||Theobald Butler, 1st Baron Cahir||1583||1596||New creation
|-
|}

References

 

Lists of peers by decade
1580s in England
1580s in Ireland
16th century in England
16th century in Scotland
16th century in Ireland
16th-century English nobility
16th-century Scottish peers
16th-century Irish people
Peers